King's Highway 41, commonly referred to as Highway 41, is a provincially maintained highway in the Canadian province of Ontario. The  highway travels in a predominantly north–south direction across eastern Ontario, from Highway 7 in Kaladar to Highway 148 in Pembroke. The majority of this distance crosses through a rugged forested region known as Mazinaw Country. However, the route enters the agricultural Ottawa Valley near Dacre. A significant portion of Highway41 follows the historic Addington Colonization Road, built in 1854.

Highway41 was first assumed in 1935, though ironically the initial route is no longer part of the highway. It was extended north to meet the eastern terminus of Highway 60 at Golden Lake in 1937. The following year, a southern discontinuous section of the highway was established north from Picton in Prince Edward County. A series of changes in 1957 extended Highway60 east to Renfrew and Highway41 north to Pembroke; this established a concurrency of the two highways through Eganville, which remains to this day.

The Prince Edward County section was renumbered as Highway 49 in 1965 in anticipation of the building of the Quinte Skyway, while the original section, between Highway2 and Highway7, was transferred to Lennox and Addington County in 1998, and is now County Road41.

Route description 

Highway41 is a  highway that travels in a north–south direction from Highway7 in Kaladar to Highway148 in Pembroke. The majority of this distance crosses through a rugged forested region of Eastern Ontario known as Mazinaw Country. However, the route enters the Ottawa Valley at a point between Dacre and Eganville; north of there the land use surrounding the highway becomes partially agricultural.

Traffic levels along Highway41, in 2016, were highest near Pembroke, where approximately 5,300vehicles travelled the road on an average day. Volumes are lowest through the Mazinaw Country portion of the route, between Bon Echo Provincial Park and Eganville, where less than 2,000, and as few as 1,300vehicles, travel the highway on an average day.
With the exception of a few short passing lanes, the entire length of the highway is two lanes wide.

Two locations along Highway41 are maintained under a Connecting Link agreement between the Ministry of Transportation of Ontario (MTO) and the local municipality, in which funding for maintenance is split between the two.
The remainder of the highway is maintained solely by the MTO.

Kaladar – Madawaska River 

Highway41 begins in the centre of Lennox and Addington County at Highway7, in the village of Kaladar. The highway once continued south to Napanee, but this is now County Road41.
It travels north, immediately ascending Kaladar Hill into a swamp-laden, heavily-forested region of the Canadian Shield, roughly following the Addington Colonization Road.
After passing through the village of Northbrook, the highway — and more accurately, the original Addington Road — straddle the boundary between Lennox and Addington County and Frontenac County, as well as the municipalities of Addington Highlands and North Frontenac. It passes through the community of Cloyne, then meets the southernmost point of Mazinaw Lake, of which it travels near or along the western shore.

The highway enters Bon Echo Provincial Park, which sits near the midpoint of the lake. Within the park is Mazinaw Rock, a large  pictograph-laden granite rock escarpment, as well as a National Historic Site of Canada.
North of the park, Highway41 — now entirely within Lennox and Addington County — continues alongside the northern half of Mazinaw Lake, and thereafter the Mississippi River, to the headwaters of the latter at Mackavoy Lake.
Passing through Ferguson Corners, it departs eastward from the Addington Colonization Road. At Vennachar Junction, it turns north, then encounters Highway 28 just east of the town of Denbigh. Meandering northeast from there, the highway roughly parallels Hydes Creek to its confluence with the Madawaska River before curving east into Renfrew County. It crosses the river on a multiple-span concrete rigid arch bridge just prior to entering the community of Griffith. This bridge also serves as the downstream end of Lower Madawaska River Provincial Park.

Madawaska River – Pembroke 

Beyond Griffith, Highway41 travels through the municipality of Greater Madawaska. It winds in a generally northeast direction towards Dacre. However, just west of that community, it descends into the Ottawa Valley and meets Highway 132. At that junction, drivers must turn to remain on Highway41; Highway132 continues through Dacre. The route proceeds north, now in the municipality of Bonnechere Valley, and shortly after passing Constant Lake, straightens towards Eganville. Farmland appears for the first time at the hamlet of Perrault.
An intersection with former Highway 512 marks the entrance to Eganville, as well as the beginning of the Connecting Link Agreement through the town. After crossing the Bonnechere River, it meets Highway60, with both highways becoming concurrent northward; the Connecting Link ends at Hartwig Street.

It gradually wraps around the east side of Lake Doré, before curving northward. After crossing Snake Creek at the northeastern tip of the lake, the highway travels straight north through forests. It passes through several communities within a short distance, the most significant of which is Rankin. Near its northern end, the route zig-zags into the municipality of Laurentian Valley, then curves northeast to intersect Highway 17 on the outskirts of Pembroke.
Within the town, both Highway41 and Highway148 are maintained under a Connecting Link Agreement.
Highway41 follows Paul Martin Drive, River Road, and McKay Street through Pembroke before ending just south of the Ottawa River. The intersection of McKay Street and Pembroke Street serves as the northern terminus of Highway41, as well as the western terminus of Highway148.

History 

Although it did not become a provincial highway until the 1930s, the route that Highway41 follows is similar to several colonization roads established in the mid-1800s. These forest-bound "roads", built to encourage settlement deeper into the province, were infamously rough wagon trails during dry times, and impassable quagmires throughout the spring and fall. A rough line for this road was surveyed by Robert Bell in 1847.
Construction as far north as the Madawaska River was carried out under the supervision of local surveyor Aylsworth B. Perry between 1854 and 1857.
However, until the construction of Highway41, travel through the Addington Highlands and Opeongo Hills was slow and arduous.

Provincial assumption 
Highway 41 was first established by the provincial government in the mid-1930s. The first section established is ironically the only section that was decommissioned as a provincial highway in 1998.
Just over two years later, the route was extended to Highway60 at Golden Lake. The DHO assumed the portion within Lennox and Addington on October6, 1937, followed two weeks later by the portion within Renfrew County on October20.
Both Highway60 and Highway41 shared a terminus at a junction in Golden Lake from 1948 until 1957, when the Eganville to Pembroke Road was designated as Highway41. The section between Eganville and Golden Lake consequently became an extension of Highway60.

Most of Highway41 was an unimproved road prior to 1935. Only two sections were paved: the route through Erinsville — initially following Furlong Road — was paved from Keegans Road south through the village to the cutoff to Tamworth, while the Selby Road was paved from Napanee north to Sharps Corners.
Paving operations on the route did not begin until the 1940s, starting with the section through Eganville in 1941.
In the intermediate years, several new alignments, bypassing the route of the original Addington Road, were graded and opened as gravel roads.
Construction of the multi-span Madawaska River Bridge in Griffith began in 1940.
It was completed and, along with a bypass east of Denbigh, opened in 1942.
Construction of an unpaved diversion at Bon Echo, bypassing the original route along what is now Mazinaw Heights Road, was completed in 1943.
Highway41 was paved and realigned from north of Eganville to Golden Lake (along what is now Highway60) in 1944,
and from Kaladar to Northbrook in 1945.
Paving and improvements between Cloyne and Dacre were carried out over the next three years: from Denbigh to Dacre in 1948; from Bon Echo to Mackavoy Lake in 1949, and the remaining gaps from Cloyne to Bon Echo and from Mackavoy Lake to Denbigh in 1950.
The final gravel section, between Roblin and Erinsville, was paved in 1953.

Prince Edward County 

Within Prince Edward County, a southern discontinuous section of Highway41 existed from 1938 to 1965.
On April13, 1938, the DHO took over the road between Picton and Cole's Wharf, labelling it as the Picton to Napanee Road. This section never connected directly with Highway41 north of Napanee, as planned; it would eventually be incorporated into the route of Highway49 in the mid-1960s.
Travelling north from Picton alongside the Bay of Quinte in Prince Edward County, it followed a similar route to the present-day Prince Edward County Road49, as far as Roblin Mills. From there it curved to follow County Road35. The entire early route was known as the Lower High Shore Road; there was no road directly north from Roblin Mills. Highway41 passed through Mount Carmel before ending at Cole's Wharf, where a ferry crossed to Huff's Wharf. County roads continued thereafter to Napanee.

Like the rest of Highway41, this section was unpaved at first.
Approximately  between Picton and Woodville were paved in 1946.
The remainder of the southern portion, to Cole's Wharf, was paved by 1948.

A span across the Bay of Quinte, which separates most of Prince Edward County from the Ontario mainland, was a significant undertaking that required funding and manpower that was unavailable through the war years. It would take until the 1960s until proposals for a high-level bridge over the waterway gained traction. In November 1964, the first contract for construction on the Quinte Skyway, west of Deseronto, was awarded.
The DHO had planned to begin work in September 1962, but funding was unavailable.
Severe winter weather prevented work on the contract from proceeding until the spring of 1965,
by which time the entire southern section of Highway41 had been renumbered as Highway49.
The Quinte Skyway, and a realigned Highway49, were both completed in September 1967, with premier John Robarts opening the bridge during a motorcade on September6.

North to Pembroke 

Highway41 was extended to Pembroke on April11, 1957, when the road north of Eganville and around Lake Dore was assumed by the DHO.
For nearly two decades, the route followed the shoreline of Lake Dore along what is now Point Church Drive. During the mid-1960s, proposals were raised to bypass the majority of the new extension, including both the current route south of Lake Dore, as well as a new route from there to Highway17 that was ultimately never built. The unbuilt bypass would have travelled northeast from Lake Dore, passing near Micksburg and ending mid-way between Cobden and Pembroke.
The bypass around Lake Dore was completed between 1978 and 1980.

Within Pembroke, Highway41 entered the town as it does today, but curved northwest onto Boundary Road to avoid crossing the Muskrat River. It followed Boundary Road to end at Highway62 (Bruham Avenue).
In 1962, the route was redirected to downtown Pembroke via Eganville Road and Christie Street to end at Highway17/62 (Pembroke Street West).
This routing remained in place until the Highway17 Pembroke Bypass opened on September10, 1982, after which the current path of Highway41 along Paul Martin Drive, River Road and McKay Street was established. The former route of Highway17 along Pembroke Street was subsequently renumbered as Highway148.

Downloading 
As part of a series of budget cuts initiated by premier Mike Harris under his Common Sense Revolution platform in 1995, numerous highways deemed to no longer be of significance to the provincial network were decommissioned and responsibility for the routes transferred to a lower level of government, a process referred to as downloading.

Major intersections

References

External links 

Canada NewsWire Press Release
Highway 41 length and route
Highway 41 pictures and information

041